The Illinois State Capitol, located in Springfield, Illinois, houses the legislative and executive branches of the government of the U.S. state of Illinois. The current building is the sixth to serve as the capitol building since Illinois was admitted to the United States in 1818. Built in the architectural styles of the French Renaissance and Italianate, it was designed by Cochrane and Garnsey, an architecture and design firm based in Chicago. Ground was broken for the new capitol on March 11, 1868, and the building was completed twenty years later for a total cost of $4.5 million.
                                                                       
The building contains the chambers for the Illinois General Assembly, which is made up of the Illinois House of Representatives and the Illinois Senate. An office for the Governor of Illinois, additional offices, and committee rooms are also in the building. The capitol's footprint is cross-shaped, with four equal wings. Its tall central dome and tower roofs are covered in zinc to provide a silvery facade which does not weather. Architecture scholar Jean A. Follett describes it as a building that "is monumental in scale and rich in detail."  The interior of the dome features a plaster frieze painted to resemble bronze, which illustrates scenes from Illinois history, and stained glass windows, including a stained glass replica of the state seal in the oculus of the dome.

Description

The only state capitols taller than it are the non-classical designs of Louisiana and Nebraska, whose governments opted for more modern structures. It is the highest (though not the tallest) building in Sangamon County. The Wyndham Springfield City Centre is taller than the capitol, however it is on lower ground, making the capitol building higher. A city statute does not allow buildings higher than the capitol. Each wing of the building is aligned to the 4 major compass directions; from the north end to the south end the building measures  and from the east end to the west end . The capitol occupies a nine acre plot of land which forms the capitol grounds. William Douglas Richardson served as one of the principal contractors for the construction of the capitol building, and Jacob Bunn, an in-law of W. D. Richardson, served as chairman of the capitol construction steering committee.

When the capitol was constructed, several empty shafts were included for the future installation of elevators. The original water-operated elevators were installed in 1887 and were sometimes the subject of ridicule by local newspapers as they were deemed inadequate for a building with the prestige of the State Capitol. Electric elevators were later installed sometime before 1939 when the legislature appropriated $30,000 for their repair.

Renovation

In 2011, the facility underwent a $50 million renovation, primarily focused on the west wing, to upgrade life safety, ADA accessibility and mechanical, electrical and plumbing infrastructure as well as architectural improvements to bring the capitol closer to its original 1870s appearance, the "period of significance" for the building. Improvements included refinishing of interiors and exposed brick arches in the basement; installation of maiden lamp posts for the grand staircase, new chandeliers, and copper-clad exterior doors; and removal of a second floor mezzanine.

The addition of the maiden statues is particularly notable, since they had been intended for the building since the 1870s when architect Alfred Piquenard designed them as part of the original plan. Piquenard was also architect for the Iowa State Capitol, which is of a similar style, albeit 3/4 the size.  Illinois legislators of the 1870s thought that the scantily clad women were too risqué but the Iowans had no objection. Illinois therefore had plain lamps installed at the base of its grand staircase, whereas the maiden lamps intended for Illinois were instead delivered to and installed at the Iowa State Capitol in Des Moines, where they remain to this day. The lamps now installed at Illinois as part of this renovation are replicas of those at Iowa's capitol.

In 2014, the renovation achieved LEED Gold certification under the US Green Building Councils New Construction and Major Renovation program.

In December 2021, officials began another renovation program focused on the north wing that will cost of $224 million and last until 2025.  Like the earlier work in the west wing, this will focus on updating fire protection systems, mechanical, electrical and HVAC systems and making additional areas ADA accessible. Work will also remove asbestos and add an underground garage and visitor screening area to improve security.  During the 1960s and 1970s, mezzanines were constructed in some offices to increase space for legislators. Work will remove these and restore the original paint colors.

Former capitols

Kaskakia Statehouse
The current Capitol of Illinois is the sixth such building in the history of the state. The first was located in Kaskaskia, Illinois, a city on the Mississippi River founded by the French in 1709. Kaskaskia had been the territorial capital of Illinois since 1809 and had been an administrative center for much of the 18th century, so it was deemed an appropriate location for the capital of the new state. The state leased the first capitol building, a two-story building, for the sum of $4.00 per day.

Wishing to site the capital in the state's interior, the first General Assembly petitioned Congress for a grant of suitable public land.  Congress offered, and the state accepted, a land parcel up the Kaskaskia River about eighty miles northeast of Kaskaskia. This location, which would be named Vandalia, Illinois, was selected partly with the hopes of encouraging settlers to locate in expanding areas of the state. The state allowed its lease on the first capital in Kaskaskia expire and relocated to Vandalia.

Vandalia Statehouses

Located in Vandalia, 

Vandalia was the location of the second, third, and fourth capitol buildings, where the legislature met between 1820 and 1837. In 1820, with the completion of the new, or "second", capitol, Vandalia became the capital of the state. The structure burned soon thereafter and a third capitol quickly rose in 1824 at a cost of $15,000.  After its construction, many citizens began to advocate relocating the capitol to a location nearer the center of the state. A bill was introduced in 1833 for a statewide vote to determine a new location from a list of several choices including Alton, Jacksonville, Peoria, Springfield, Vandalia, and the state's actual geographic center. While Alton was the victor, the legislature determined the margin too small to be conclusive, and ignored the vote. In 1836, a young lawyer named Abraham Lincoln, along with colleagues of his of the legal profession, advocated moving the capital to Springfield. That summer the Vandalia capitol building was demolished by local citizens and replaced with the fourth capitol (built at a cost of $16,000) in an effort to keep the capital in Vandalia. Although the new brick structure was extravagant, the General Assembly ignored the gesture and voted to relocate the capital to Springfield on February 25, 1837.

Old State Capitol (built 1837) 

Located in Springfield, 

On July 4, 1837, the first brick was laid for Illinois' fifth capitol designed by John F. Rague, who also designed the nearly identical Iowa Territorial Capitol. In 1853, the capitol was completed for a total sum of $260,000, almost twenty times the cost of any such previous structure. The building was designed in the Greek Revival style from stone quarried 6 miles from the site. For many years, it was the largest and most extravagant capitol of the western frontier of the United States. The fifth capitol is closely associated with Abraham Lincoln as it was here that he argued cases before the Illinois Supreme Court, served in the State Legislature, first debated Stephen Douglas, delivered his famous "House Divided" speech, and lay in state after his assassination on April 14, 1865.

As Illinois prospered and experienced several booms in population, the fifth capitol became crowded, especially as a result of relocations after the Civil War. On February 24, 1867, the state voted to construct a new larger capitol. After breaking the ground for the sixth and current Capitol in 1868, the state recouped the costs of the fifth capitol by selling it to Sangamon County for $200,000. It served as the county court house until 1961 when the state re-purchased the building and restored it as a historic landmark, the Old State Capitol State Historic Site.

See also
List of state and territorial capitols in the United States
List of tallest domes

References

External links 

Government buildings completed in 1839
Government buildings completed in 1888
State Capitol
State capitols in the United States
Government buildings with domes
Government buildings in Illinois
National Historic Landmarks in Illinois
Buildings and structures in Springfield, Illinois
National Register of Historic Places in Springfield, Illinois
Tourist attractions in Springfield, Illinois
Government buildings on the National Register of Historic Places in Illinois
Skyscrapers in Illinois
Skyscraper office buildings in Illinois
1839 establishments in Illinois
1888 establishments in Illinois